Hoag is a not-for-profit regional health care delivery network in Orange County, California, that treats nearly 30,000 inpatients and 350,000 outpatients annually. Hoag consists of two acute-care hospitals, seven health centers and four urgent care centers. Hoag Hospital Newport Beach, which has served Orange County since 1952, and Hoag Hospital Irvine, which opened in 2010, are Magnet designated hospitals by the American Nurses Credentialing Center (ANCC). Hoag offers a blend of health care services that include five institutes providing specialized services in the following areas: cancer, heart and vascular, neurosciences, women’s health and orthopedics through Hoag’s affiliate Hoag Orthopedic Institute.

Hospitals
Hoag Hospital Newport Beach and Hoag Hospital Irvine are community hospitals in California.

Hoag Hospital Newport Beach is an acute care, not-for-profit hospital located on California's Orange County coastline between Los Angeles and San Diego in the city of Newport Beach.

Hoag Hospital Irvine opened in 2010 and is a 154-bed, acute-care general hospital offering the residents of Irvine and surrounding communities a variety of inpatient and outpatient services as well as a fully staffed emergency room.

Facilities

Hoag Family Cancer Institute
Hoag Family Cancer Institute provides care through site-specific programs based on cancer/tumor type. Programs include diagnostics, progressive treatments and support services care.

In the media:
The hospital's Axxent FlexiShield Mini study-treatment adjunct to the Axxent Electronic Brachytherapy breast cancer treatment has been recalled. The F.D.A., which had approved the Mini on an expedited basis, is looking into the unexpected deposit of tungsten particles in patients' tissue which the device seems to have caused. The Mini, developed by Xoft and now owned by iCAD Inc., was found to have left study patients—including 27 from Hoag -- "riddled ... with hundreds of tiny particles of the heavy metal tungsten in their breast tissue and chest muscles" after surgery. Long-term implications of the particles have not yet been established, but they trigger false positives in mammograms and concern patients and observers. The Axxent Electronic Brachytherapy has not been recalled.

Hoag Heart & Vascular Institute
Hoag Heart & Vascular Institute offers surgical techniques including minimally invasive heart surgery, angioplasty, cardiac stent placement, intraoperative ablation for treatment of arrhythmia, beating heart surgery, and heart bypass with endoscopic vein harvesting.

Hoag Neurosciences Institute
Hoag Neurosciences Institute incorporates diagnostic technologies, treatment modalities and integration of medical specialists to deliver the care for all complex neurological disorders, including: Alzheimer’s/dementia, brain tumors, brain aneurysms/vascular malformations, epilepsy, headache/pain syndromes, movement disorders/Parkinson's disease, multiple sclerosis, sleep disorders, spinal disorders/tumors, and stroke.

Hoag Orthopedic Institute
The Hoag Orthopedic Institute enterprise consists of one specialty hospital in Irvine with 72 beds and 9 operating rooms, along with four surgery centers: Hoag Orthopedic Institute Surgery Center in Newport Beach, Main Street Specialty Surgery Center in Orange, California Specialty Surgery Center in Mission Viejo, and Diagnostic & Interventional Surgery Center in Marina Del Rey, California.

Hoag Women’s Health Institute
Women's health services, including gynecologic care, maternal child services, and progressive breast care through Hoag Breast Care Center.

Hoag Breast Care Center
Hoag recently became the first hospital in California to offer tomosynthesis or 3D mammography for women with dense breast tissue.

History
The idea to build a hospital for the residents of coastal Orange County dates back to 1944. The Rev. Raymond Brahams, seven Presbyterian church members and one physician formed a corporation called the Presbyterian Hospital of Laguna Beach. They began a fund-raising campaign in the local community and changed the name to the Presbyterian Hospital of Orange County after securing a site on the bluffs in Newport Beach. Unable to afford construction costs following World War II, their search for funds became more critical.

In 1950, the Hoag Family Foundation-established 10 years earlier by George Hoag Sr., who was an early partner in the J.C. Penney Company, his wife Grace and their son George Hoag II-learned of the hospital project and donated the funds needed to begin construction. With the support of the Hoag Family Foundation and the community, the hospital was completed in just two years and named Hoag Memorial Hospital Presbyterian.

The George Hoag Family Foundation and the Association of Presbyterian Members, as the two founding organizations of the hospital, continue providing leadership as corporate members of the Hoag corporation. These corporate members annually elect the board of directors, which includes representatives from the Hoag community and medical staff, as well as the chief executive officer. When the hospital opened on September 15, 1952, there were 75 beds, 68 staff physicians and 60 employees.

Rankings 
U.S. News & World Report’s 2021-2022 Best Hospitals Rankings named Hoag Memorial Hospital Presbyterian, the highest ranked hospital in Orange County, the fourth-best hospital in the Los Angeles metro area and ninth-best hospital in California.

References

https://doctor.webmd.com/doctor/john-granzella-f8ba136e-a0a7-4c24-a043-41ab033ae779-overview

External links
 Official website

Healthcare in California